Betty Eve Ballinger (18541936) was a founder of the Daughters of The Republic of Texas.

Early life
Betty Eve Ballinger was born in Galveston, Texas, on February 3, 1854, to William and Harriet Patrick Jack Ballinger. Her grandfather was William Houston Jack, a veteran of the Battle of San Jacinto and a public official in the Republic of Texas. Her father, William Pitt Ballinger, was a Galveston attorney.

Ballinger attended primary school in New Orleans and Baltimore. When she was not away at school, she resided in the family's home in Galveston.

Career
Ballinger and Hally Ballinger Bryan Perry (a cousin) formed an organization in 1891 to recognize veterans of the Texas Revolution, especially those who served at the Battle of San Jacinto. In 1891, Ballinger and some other women met in Houston to found the Daughters of the Republic of Texas. She joined its executive committee, which composed a constitution and by-laws. The group convened its first annual meeting in Lampasas, Texas in 1892. Meanwhile, Ballinger formed the Galveston Chapter of the organization and led the chapter for its first few years.

In 1912, Ballinger joined the Galveston Equal Suffrage Association and served  of as the new organization first vice president. Their attempt convince local voters to extend suffrage in Galveston failed, though, as the pro-suffrage movement was linked to prohibition of alcohol and both amendments were defeated by a similar margin.

References

1854 births
1936 deaths
American suffragists